Baramau is a village and Gram panchayat in Bilhaur Tehsil, Kanpur Nagar district, Uttar Pradesh, India. It is located 57 KM away from Kanpur City. Village code is 149947.

References

Villages in Kanpur Nagar district